Novomustafino (Yañı Mostafa) is a rural locality (a village) in Batyrovsky Selsoviet, Aurgazinsky District, Bashkortostan, Russia. The population was 49 as of 2010. There is 1 street.

Geography 
Novomustafino is located 22 km east of Tolbazy (the district's administrative centre) by road. Nikolayevka is the nearest rural locality.

References 

Rural localities in Aurgazinsky District